Arkoff International Pictures was a film production company set up by Samuel Z. Arkoff, co-founder of American International Pictures (AIP).

Arkoff sold AIP to Filmways in 1979, which he later described as "a giant mistake... [they] wanted to change everything AIP stood for." Arkoff stayed on for a time as consultant but eventually sold the rest of his stock and retired. AIP did not last long afterwards.

Arkoff decided to come out of retirement establishing a new company which was run along similar principles to AIP. Its first film was Q – The Winged Serpent entirely financed by Arkoff himself.

"People always ask me if it's difficult for me at my age to keep up with trends", said Arkoff in 1982. "What they don't understand is that I'm not older today. I was already older before."

In 1987 it was announced Arkoff had secured funds from a Canadian investor "reported to run into nine figures". Arkoff announced a series of films to be made in Canada, the US and Mexico with his son Lou Arkoff as executive vice president. The company's founder advised an audience tending an acquisitions seminar at the Showbiz Expo to divide rights in 1987 as a way of recouping their costs.

Filmography
Q – The Winged Serpent (1982)
The Final Terror (1983)
Up the Creek (1984) – as "Samuel Z. Arkoff and Louis S. Arkoff Productions"
Hellhole (1985)

Proposed films
The Night in the Woods (1982)
Ice Riders (1987) – the story of an ice motor cyclist traumatised by a friend's death, trying to make a new start in a new town
Nightcrawler (1987) – a man who returns from the dead to wreck vengeance
sequel to I Was a Teenage Werewolf starring Michael Landon's children
Club Malibu (1983–84)
Spike (1982–83)
Teachers (1982)
P.S. I Love You (1982–83)
The Oracle aka Reunion (1980–83)
Outcalls Only (1985)
Phenomena (1985)
Phobia 1986–1996 (dates broken)
Rotate 1983–1984
Trust Matters 1963–1987
remake of Machine Gun Kelly (1987–1988)
Double or Nothing 1988
They're Here 1988
Future Cop 1988
Undercover 1988
Harry Knapp 1988
Angel of Mercy1986–1988
Willie Mays Story 1988
Big Time 1988
Marilyn 1988
Girl Friday 1988
My Yesterdays are Your Tomorrows 1988–1989
Skyscraper 1983–1984
untitled Robert Hays project 1982
Tow Truck Cowboy (1981)
Machismo 1981–1982
Fast Food (1981)
Wreckers (1982)

References

External links
Arkoff International at IMDb
Samuel Z. Arkoff Papers – includes Arkoff International Pictures information

Mass media companies established in 1981
Film production companies of the United States